Carey Park may refer to:

 Carey Park, Trelawny Parish, Jamaica
 Carey Park, Cornwall, United Kingdom
 Carey Park (Atlanta), a neighborhood in Atlanta, Georgia, United States
 Carey Park, part of Northwich Woodlands